Niazabad (also Romanized as Nīāzābād, Neyāzābād, and Nīyāz Ābād) is a village in Bostan Rural District, Sangan District, Khaf County, Razavi Khorasan Province, Iran. At the 2006 census, its population was 836, in 189 families.

References 

Populated places in Khaf County